The Samsung Galaxy A5 (2017) (or Samsung Galaxy A5 2017 Edition) is an Android smartphone. It was announced on January 2, 2017, along with Samsung Galaxy A3 (2017) and Samsung Galaxy A7 (2017). This move marks Samsung's first product launch since the discontinuation of the Galaxy Note 7 in October 2016.

The Samsung Galaxy A5 (2017) runs Android 6.0.1 Marshmallow right out of the box and runs on TouchWiz interface, but was updated during August 2017 to Android 7.0 Nougat and once again in February 2018 to run Android 8.0 Oreo. The smartphone features an Exynos 7880 SoC consisting of 8 ARM Cortex-A53 backed by the Mali-T830 GPU and sports 3 GB of RAM and 32 GB internal storage, expandable to 256 GB via a dedicated MicroSD slot that it has unlike the predecessors of the A5 (which it was placed in the second Nano-SIM slot). The device retains a non-removable battery like its predecessor, rated at 3000mAh with fast-charging capabilities. Its extra features similar to Samsung's 2016 flagships include IP68 water resistance, Always On Display and 3D glass backing with Gorilla Glass 4. A new "Always On display" functionality displays a clock, calendar and notifications on screen when the device is in standby.

Availability
Following the unveiling, Samsung announced that they will sell up to 20 million smartphones, targeting Western and Eastern Europe, Africa, Asia and Latin America. Unlike its predecessors, the Galaxy A5 (2017) will not be coming to the United States. However, the Galaxy A5 (2017) is going to be sold in Canada, unlike the 2016 edition. It's available in four colors, including black and rose-gold.

Variants

References

Android (operating system) devices
Samsung Galaxy
Samsung smartphones
Mobile phones introduced in 2017
Discontinued smartphones